Aleksandra Crnčević (born ) is a Serbian volleyball player. She is part of the Serbia women's national volleyball team. On club level she played for Lokomotiv Baku in 2015.

Awards

Clubs
 2017–18 CEV Champions League -  Runner-Up, with CSM Volei Alba Blaj

References

External links
profile at CEV
profile at greekvolley.gr

1987 births
Living people
Serbian women's volleyball players
Olympiacos Women's Volleyball players
Sportspeople from Sremska Mitrovica
Serbian expatriate sportspeople in Greece
Serbian expatriate sportspeople in Romania
Expatriate volleyball players in Romania
Serbian expatriate sportspeople in France
Serbian expatriate sportspeople in Japan
Serbian expatriate sportspeople in Azerbaijan
Serbian expatriate sportspeople in Turkey
Serbian expatriate sportspeople in Russia